= Chinese Courier =

Chinese Courier was an English-language newspaper in Canton, China, in the 19th century. It was printed every week.
